Priozerny is a rural locality (a settlement) in Posyolok Nikologory, Vyaznikovsky District, Vladimir Oblast, Russia. The population was 659 as of 2010. There are 10 streets.

Geography 
Priozerny is located 22 km southwest of Vyazniki (the district's administrative centre) by road. Nikologory is the nearest rural locality.

References 

Rural localities in Vyaznikovsky District